The 17651 / 17652 Kacheguda–Chengalpattu Express is an Express train belonging to Indian Railways – South Central Railway zone that runs between Kacheguda and  Near By Chennai City in India.

It operates as train number 17652 from Kacheguda to Chengalpattu Jn and as train number 17651 in the reverse direction, serving the states of Tamil Nadu, Telangana & Andhra Pradesh

Coaches

17652 / 51 Kacheguda–Chengalpattu Jn Express presently has 1 AC 2 tier, 4 AC 3 tier, 8 Sleeper class, 3 General Unreserved & 2 SLR (Seating cum Luggage Rake) coaches. It does not have a pantry car.

As is customary with most train services in India, coach composition may be amended at the discretion of Indian Railways depending on demand

Service

The 17652 Kacheguda–Chengalpattu Jn Express covers the distance of 827 kilometres in 15 hours 20 mins (54.05 km/hr) & in 16 hours 20 mins as 17651 Chengalpattu Jn–Kacheguda Express (50.74 km/hr).

As the average speed of the train is below 55 km/hr, as per Indian Railways rules, its fare does not include a Superfast surcharge.

Routeing

The 17652 / 51 Kacheguda–Chengalpattu Jn Express runs from Kacheguda via Gooty, Cuddapah, Renigunta Junction, ,Chennai Egmore  , Tambaram to Chengalpattu Jn.

Traction

As the route is partly electrified, a Gooty-based WDP-4D locomotive hauls the train from Kacheguda to  handing over to an Lallaguda-based WAP-7 or Vijayawada-based WAP-4 which powers the train for the remainder of the journey until Chengalpattu.

RSA 
17643/17644 Circar Express

Demands 
There are Demands to extend this train from Chengalpattu Junction to Puducherry.

References

External links

Express trains in India
Rail transport in Tamil Nadu
Rail transport in Andhra Pradesh
Transport in Hyderabad, India
Transport in Chennai